Faith Baptist School may refer to any of these schools in the United States:

 Faith Baptist School (Colorado), a high school in Longmont, Boulder County
 Faith Baptist School (Michigan), a private school in Davison, for Kindergarten through 12th grade
 Faith Baptist School (Virginia), a high school in Spotsylvania County
 Faith Baptist School (Salisbury, Maryland), a private school for Kindergarten through 12th grade

See also 
 Faith Baptist Bible College and Theological Seminary, a private undergraduate and graduate institution located in Ankeny, Iowa
 Faith Baptist College and Seminary, a private Baptist-oriented college in Anderson, South Carolina, that closed in 1998